Self-referential humor, also known as self-reflexive humor, self-aware humor, or meta humor, is a type of comedic expression that—either directed toward some other subject, or openly directed toward itself—is self-referential in some way, intentionally alluding to the very person who is expressing the humor in a comedic fashion, or to some specific aspect of that same comedic expression.  Self-referential humor expressed discreetly and surrealistically is a form of bathos. In general, self-referential humor often uses hypocrisy, oxymoron, or paradox to create a contradictory or otherwise absurd situation that is humorous to the audience.

History
Old Comedy of Classical Athens is held to be the first—in the extant sources—form of self-referential comedy. Aristophanes, whose plays form the only remaining fragments of Old Comedy, used fantastical plots, grotesque and inhuman masks and status reversals of characters to slander prominent politicians and court his audience's approval.

Self-referential humor was popularized by Douglas Hofstadter who wrote several books on the subject of self-reference, the term meta has come to be used, particularly in art, to refer to something that is self-referential.

Classification

Meta-jokes are a popular form of humor. They contain several somewhat different, but related categories: joke templates, self-referential jokes, and jokes about jokes (meta-humour).

Joke template
This form of meta-joke is a sarcastic jab at the endless refitting of joke forms (often by professional comedians) to different circumstances or characters without a significant innovation in the humor.

Self-referential jokes
Self-referential jokes must refer to themselves rather than to larger classes of previous jokes.

Jokes about jokes ("meta-humor")
Meta-humour is humour about humour. Here meta is used to describe that the joke explicitly talks about other jokes, a usage similar to the words metadata (data about data), metatheatrics (a play within a play, as in Hamlet), and metafiction.

Other examples

Alternate punchlines 
Another kind of meta-humour makes fun of poor jokes by replacing a familiar punchline with a serious or nonsensical alternative. Such jokes expose the fundamental criterion for joke definition, "funniness", via its deletion. Comedians such as George Carlin and Mitch Hedberg used metahumour of this sort extensively in their routines.

Anti-humor
Anti-humor is a type of indirect and alternative comedy that involves the joke-teller delivering something that is intentionally not funny, or lacking in intrinsic meaning. The humor of such jokes is based on the surprise factor of absence of an expected joke or of a punch line in a narration that is set up as a joke. It depends upon reference to the audience's expectations on what a joke is.

Breaking the fourth wall

Self-referential humor is at times combined with breaking the fourth wall to make explicit reference directly to the audience or to make self-reference to an element of the medium the characters should not be aware of.

Class-referential jokes
This form of meta-joke contains a familiar class of jokes as part of the joke.

Bar jokes

Comedian jokes
The process of being a humorist is also the subject of meta-jokes; for example, on an episode of QI, Jimmy Carr made the comment, "When I told them I wanted to be a comedian, they laughed. Well, they're not laughing now!"— a joke previously associated with Bob Monkhouse.

Limericks
A limerick referring to the anti-humor of limericks:

W. S. Gilbert wrote one of the definitive "anti-limericks":

Tom Stoppard's anti-limerick from Travesties:

Metaparody
Metaparody is a form of humor or literary technique consisting "parodying the parody of the original", sometimes to the degree that the viewer is unclear as to which subtext is genuine and which subtext parodic.

RAS Syndrome
RAS syndrome refers to the redundant use of one or more of the words that make up an acronym or initialism with the abbreviation itself, thus in effect repeating one or more words. However, "RAS" stands for Redundant Acronym Syndrome; therefore, the full phrase yields "Redundant Acronym Syndrome syndrome" and is self-referencing in a comical manner.  It also reflects an excessive use of TLAs (Three Letter Acronyms).

Examples

Hedberg
Stand-up comedian Mitch Hedberg would often follow up a joke with an admission that it was poorly told, or insist to the audience that "that joke was funnier than you acted."

Rehnquist
Marc Galanter in the introduction to his book Lowering the Bar: Lawyer Jokes and Legal Culture cites a meta-joke in a speech of Chief Justice William Rehnquist:
I've often started off with a lawyer joke, a complete caricature of a lawyer who's been nasty, greedy, and unethical. But I've stopped that practice. I gradually realized that the lawyers in the audience didn't think the jokes were funny and the non-lawyers didn't know they were jokes.

See also
 Indirect self-reference
 In-joke
 Intertextuality
 Irony
 Dadaism

References

Humour
Jokes
Metafictional techniques
Self-reference